R317 road may refer to:
 R317 road (Ireland)
 R317 road (South Africa)